Chris Roberts is an American professional skateboarder and host of the podcast The Nine Club with Chris Roberts.

Early life 
Roberts was born in Inglewood, California on August 13, 1976, and raised in Malibu, California. He grew up skateboarding around Los Angeles County and Southern California.

Career 
In 2007, Roberts turned pro for Chocolate Skateboards. In 2009, while filming for Crailtap's "Lil Slice of Life" web clip, Roberts' cat, Garvy, figured prominently in the segment. After becoming an inside joke among sponsored Southern California skateboarders, Roberts's cat was featured on a series of skateboard decks and merchandise for a variety of his sponsors' brands.

"The Back Forty" project (2014) and its evolution 
Roberts collaborated with Marc Johnson and Kenny Anderson to launch the "Back Forty" project in mid-2013/early 2014, a creative outlet meant to build and retain quality skateboarding media, industry, and cultural content by and for skateboarders, instead of allowing outside companies unrelated to skate culture capitalizing on skateboarding's popularity and global reach.

Johnson asserted in a March 2014 interview that while the project sold products, it was not a company per se. On the Back Forty's Facebook page, the project is self-defined as a commitment to "Becoming the voice for what skateboarding has to say for itself." Johnson further explained: "We have tons of ideas that don't belong anywhere else ... Back Forty's a home for all the ideas that we have that don't really vibe with anything else that we're involved in."

While the project has been largely inactive in recent years, the creative vision which originated with the Back Forty continues in Roberts' Nine Club podcast and web series (see below). Johnson appeared on episode #36 of The Nine Club hosted by Roberts where the two discussed their ideas about skateboarding media and industry opportunities for lifelong skateboarders. While technically unrelated to The Back Forty, the podcast shows a clear vision of furthering the missions of the former project and generating skateboarding culture, history, and business content by and for skateboarders.

The Nine Club (2016–present) 
In 2016, Roberts started The Nine Club with Chris Roberts, an interview program hosted by Roberts, Roger Bagley, and Kelly Hart. The show, which has over two-hundred episodes and reached its five-year anniversary in June 2021, has interviewed some of the most legendary personalities in professional skateboarding, including Steve Caballero, Lance Mountain, Chad Muska, Bam Margera, Andrew Reynolds, Tony Hawk, Mike Carroll, Marc Johnson, and Paul Rodriguez.

The program has the tagline "the show that has skaters talking." Guests often provide humorous and historically insightful stories and anecdotes about skateboarding culture and history through their own unique experiences and perspectives. Guests have commented on the show's intellectual and historiographic merits, highlighting the program's value as an oral history archive and its conceptual relationship to programs such as the Smithsonian's Innoskate program.

The Nine Club with Chris Roberts featured rapper Li'l Wayne, who is a recreational skateboarder, in late 2016, garnering over 350,000 views.

Guests have provided symbolic gifts for the set. For example, in episode #36 Marc Johnson provided the set with a digital picture frame that plays Roberts' world-famous switch kickflip, switch manual at the West LA Courthouse, looping the trick on repeat. In episode #43, Erik Bragg provided the hosts with a vintage styled The Nine Club neon sign. Both artifacts are prominently displayed on set and are visible throughout subsequent episodes. Brian Wenning also provided Kelly Hart with one of his original Habitat pro model decks on episode #53. Chris Robert's still skateboards however he keeps it more to curb skating.

Video parts 

 1998: Tim Dowling's Listen
 1999: Logic's Issue 03
 1999: Chocolate Skateboard's The Chocolate Tour
 2002: Matt Solomon's Land Pirates
 2003: Girl Skateboard's Yeah Right!
 2004: Chocolate Skateboard's Hot Chocolate
 2004: Fuel TV's The Captain & Casey Show (S1 E3)
 2006: Transworld's Time To Shine
 2007: Eric Longden's Via Marina
 2012: Crailtap's Shit Pro Skaters Say
 2012: Girl & Chocolate Skateboards' Pretty Sweet
 2016: Biebel's Park – On Blast
 2017: Chris Roberts Compilation

Other appearances 

 1996: Toy Machine's Welcome to Hell (Friends Section)
 1997: Transworld's Cinematographer Project
 1999: Chocolate Tour
 2002: Arcade Skateboard's Who?
 2004: Chocolate Skateboard's Se Habla Canuck
 2005: Adio's Rock Adio
 2005: Chocolate Skateboards' Hittin Britain/Oui Will Rock You
 2007: Girl & Chocolate Skateboards' Badass Meets Dumbass
 2008: Chocolate Skateboards' La Felicita' / Easy Steady Trailer
 2013: Alli Sport's "Picture This" Chris Roberts' House Tour with Garvey the Cat
 2013: Alli Sport's Chris Roberts' Skateboard Setup
 2013: Roger Bagley's Data Recovery
 2013: Skate Warehouse's Integrity
 2015: Girl & Chocolate Skateboard's Going Dumb Up The 101
 2017: Chocolate Chip (with Justin Eldridge)
 2017: Skate Fillet Episode 100
 2018: Skate Warehouse's Crailtap HQ Tour with Chris Roberts
 2018: Transworld's Interests

Crailtap clips 

 2009: Crail Couch with Chris Roberts #1
 2009: Lil Slice of Life
 2009: Crail Couch With Jeron Wilson (Dubbed By Chris Roberts)
 2010:Mini Top 5 with Chris Roberts #1
 2010: Mini Top 5 with Chris Roberts #2
 2010: Crail Couch with Chris Roberts #2
 2010: Crail Couch with Chris Roberts & Justin Eldridge
 2010: Chunk of Chocolate (Marc's House)
 2011: Mini Top 5 with Chris Roberts #3
 2012: We Shred It, You Said It, We Read It
 2013: Lost & Filmed
 2013: Chunk of Chocolate (Parallel With Jesus & Roberts)
 2015: Girl & Chocolate Santa Ana Demo
 2016: Weakdays: Dugout Ledges
 2016: Weakdays: Hollenbeck
 2016: Weakdays: La Crescenta
 2016: Yeah Right! Log Tape: Nov. 2000
 2017: Box of Chocolate (with Justin Eldridge)
 2017: Mini Top 5 with Chris Roberts #4
 2017: Pro Picks
 2017: Weakdays: Active

Interviews 

 2004: Crailtap: Chris Roberts Feature
 2009: Adventure Sports Network: The Tuesday 25 with Chris Roberts
 2012: X-Games: Shooting The "Stuff" with Chris Roberts
 2013: Redbull: The Pro Skate Career We Dream About – Chris Roberts
 2015: Sidewalk Mag: 20 Years of Girl/Chocolate Interviews – Chris Roberts
 2017: Jenkem Mag: Behind The Scenes of The Nine Club
 2018: Pod Squad: Interview with Chris Roberts

Print/web ads 
Skate advertisements featuring Chris Roberts

2001: Welcome to Chocolate Skateboards Ad – Frontside Nosegrind
 2002: Independent Trucks – Fakie 5-0 Grind
 2004: Chocolate Skateboards – Hot Chocolate Video Ad
 2006: Chocolate Skateboards – Fakie 360 Flip, Switch Manual, Switch Frontside Pop Shuvit
 2007: Chocolate Skateboard Pro Ad – 5-0 Grind 360 Flip
 2007: Adio Shoes Pro Ad – Nosegrind Nollie Heelflip
 2008: Chocolate Skateboards – Fakie Frontside Nosegrind, to Switch Frontside Crooked Grind
 2009: Chocolate Skateboards – 15 Year Anniversary Ad
 2010: Chocolate Skateboards – Frontside Boardslide Nollie Backside 180 Heelflip
 2011: Chocolate Skateboards – Altered Portraits Ad

I'm Glad I'm Not Me 
I'm Glad I'm Not Me is a series created by Chris Roberts, featuring Chris Roberts. Each episode, Tim Olson (the camera operator) follows Chris around.

 Episode 1: Can Your Cat Shake Hands?
 Episode 2: Your Trucks On Backwards
 Episode 3: What Are you, My Skate Coach?
 Episode 4: Board Hand Flip Trick Thingy
 Episode 5: Undercover at Zumiez BFF (Not Really)

*Not to be confused with vlogs.*

The Berrics 

 2008: Battle at the Berrics 1: Chris Roberts vs. Steve Berra
 2008: Battle at the Berrics 1: Chris Roberts and the Legion of Doom vs Marc Johnson
 2008: Trickipedia: Frontside Nosegrind with Chris Roberts
 2009: Battle at the Berrics 2: Chris Roberts and the Legion of Doom vs Peter Ramondetta
 2009: First Try Friday with Chris Roberts
 2009: Text Yo Self with Chris Roberts #1
 2010: Trickipedia: Frontside 5-0 with Chris Roberts
 2010: Text Yo Self with Chris Roberts #2
 2012: Text Yo Self with Chris Roberts #3
 2012: Trickipedia: Fakie Frontside Nosegrind with Chris Roberts
 2017: Battle at the Berrics X | Unsanctioned Battle: Chris Roberts and the Legion of Doom vs. Mike Mo's Justice League
 2018: Battle at the Berrics 11: Chris Roberts vs. Mike Mo

References 

American skateboarders
Malibu, California
California people in fashion
Living people
1978 births